André Müller (born 15 November 1970, in Bergen auf Rügen) is a retired East German long jumper.

Müller represented the sports club SC Empor Rostock, and became East German champion in 1990. His personal best jump was 8.11 metres, achieved in August 1990 in Dresden.

Achievements

References

1970 births
Living people
People from Bergen auf Rügen
German male long jumpers
East German male long jumpers
Sportspeople from Mecklenburg-Western Pomerania